Radoje Kontić (Serbian Cyrillic: Радоје Контић; born 31 May 1937) is a Montenegrin former politician and technologist who served as the Prime Minister of the Federal Republic of Yugoslavia from 1993 to 1998.

Biography
He was the last Chairman of the Socialist Republic of Montenegro's Executive Council from 1989 to 1991 - a post which he obtained by riding the wave of the anti-bureaucratic putsch in Montenegro during January 1989. He also served as the Prime Minister of Yugoslavia from February 9, 1993 until May 19, 1998 when he lost a no-confidence vote. He was a member of the League of Communists of Montenegro and later a member of the Democratic Party of Socialists of Montenegro.

Like many others in the technocratically inclined second generation of Yugoslav communists, Kontić entered politics through directorial stints in state-owned companies. In Kontić's particular case, he worked his way up the corporate/political ladder in the Nikšić steelmill throughout the late 1960s and 1970s. Finally in 1978 he became a member of SR Montenegro's Executive Council, thus entering politics full-time.

References

1937 births
Living people
Politicians from Nikšić
Democratic Party of Socialists of Montenegro politicians
League of Communists of Montenegro politicians